Los Quirquinchos is a town (comuna) in Santa Fe Province, in Caseros Departamento  from Rosario,  from the provincial capital, by provincial route RP 93.

History
Domingo Funes sold to Juan Gödeken a fraction of his land, a place without any roads, population or housing, making historians think that Gödeken was responsible for the first settlement and the farmers that came next cleaned up and cultivated the fields, building the majority of the rural roads. The town's name could have been temporary, looking at the local geography which features many chañars, a tree common to the area that gave the name to the nearby town of Chañar Ladeado (literally sideways chañar). The local township (comuna) was officially founded on October 11, 1906.

Sports
The town has a local football club named Huracán Football Club, founded April 11, 1929. It plays in the local Lorenzo Tozini stadium, named after a prominent member of the club.

The town's principal annual event is Expo Globo, a rural industry and commerce show declared to be of social interest by the Federal Senate.

References

External links
  Federal site IFAM
  Provincial site

Populated places in Santa Fe Province